Ganesh Kishan (born 2 July 1978), known mononymously as Golden Star Ganesh, is an Indian actor and television presenter known for his work in Kannada cinema. Through his career in films and television shows, he has become one of the most popular celebrities and highest-paid actors in Kannada cinema. He is the recipient of several awards, including two Filmfare Awards.

Ganesh shot to fame with the film Mungaru Male (2006), which set a record in Kannada cinema. In theatres, it was speculated to have collected over 75 crore by the end of its record-breaking 865-day theatrical run. It was the first movie to be screened continuously for one year in a multiplex in any language in India. The success of Mungaru Male brought Ganesh the nickname, "Golden Star".

Ganesh won two consecutive Best Actor awards at Filmfare for the romantic comedy-drama Gaalipata (2008) and in the romantic drama Maleyali Jotheyali (2009). His other major success was Cheluvina Chittara (2007) after Mungaru Male. He then acted in Krishna (2007), Romeo (2012), Shravani Subramanya (2013), Zoom (2016) and Chamak (2017).

Early life
Ganesh was born on 2 July 1980 in Adakamaranahalli, a village in Nelamangala of Bangalore Rural district in Karnataka. His father's name is Kishan and mother's name is Sulochana. He has two younger brothers, Mahesh and Umesh; Mahesh debuted as an actor in the Kannada film Namak Haraam (2016). He has 2 children: Charithriya Ganesh and Vihaan Ganesh.

Ganesh received primary education at Basaveshwara English School in Nelamangala and secondary education in Standard English School in Dasarahalli, Bangalore. According to Ganesh, he was "mischievous and was always made to kneel down outside the classroom, but was also the darling of the teachers due to the active participation in cultural activities". While in college, he participated actively in inter-collegiate drama skits.

Career

Ganesh began his acting career in a number of television series and a telefilm that has yet to be published. He, then landed up as show host for a comedy talk-show named Comedy Time aired in Udaya TV. His popularity in the show was noted by director B. Suresha who cast him for the film Tapori (2002) for a villain role. His stint as a supporting actor continued until he was cast in the lead role in the film Mungaru Male (2006).

Debut (2001)
Following the success of this TV show, fans started to call him "Comedy Time" Ganesh.

Initial struggle (2002-2005)
His first film was Guttu, a telefilm directed by India's youngest female film director, Priyabharati Joshi, an NRI who came to India with the intention of entering the Indian film industry. Priyabharati offered Ganesh Guttu just as he was about to graduate from Adarsh Film Institute, against the advice of industry insiders who criticised her choice of a newcomer. Guttu was Ganesh's first time facing the camera, before moving on to his TV career and later, feature films. He made his beginnings as a background actor, particularly playing the role of the lead character's friend in a few films.

His first feature film role was of a villain character in the film Tapori (2002) which was directed by B. M. Suresha. Portraying the character was a "gory" experience for Ganesh, since "the hero was supposed to hit on face and hit so hard that (his) nose started bleeding". Following this, in 2003, he played side-kick roles in three films out of which M. D. Sridhar's Game For Love was noteworthy while the other two under-performed at the box-office. He continued such roles in the years 2004 and 2005 starring in films such as Dayal Padmanabhan's Baa Baaro Rasika (2004) playing Sunil Raoh's friend, V. Ravichandran's Aham Premasmi (2005) and Nagathihalli Chandrashekar's Amrithadhare (2005) co-starring Dhyan, Ramya which also had a guest role played by Amitabh Bachchan.

Mungaru Male and stardom (2006-2008)
Ganesh's first feature wide-release film, Chellata, was a moderate success and ran up to 125 days in some theatres. Rekha Vedavyas, who had already acted in quite a few films, acted opposite Ganesh in this film.

Then came the 2006 film Mungaru Male, which was a roaring success. The film was directed by Yogaraj Bhat. Ganesh had been involved in the script development process and was curious to act in the movie. He got director Bhat to meet E. Krishnappa. Since Krishnappa knew Ganesh (both hails from Adakamaranahalli, Nelamangala), he agreed to finance the film. Since Yogaraj Bhat could not get dates from any Kannada actress, he signed a relatively unknown actress, Pooja Gandhi. The film's lyrics were penned by Jayant Kaikini and music was composed by part-time music director Mano Murthy. Jayant Kaikini, son of renowned writer late Gourish Kaikini, was a well-known columnist and writer. The film was mainly shot during the rainy season in places like Madikeri, Sakaleshpura, Jog Falls and Gadag. On 2007, starred in Krishna film opposite Mungaru Male fame Pooja Gandhi, which became sensational hit at the box office, completing 100-days in main centres of Karnataka.

His third film as hero, Hudugaata, was released on 8 June 2007. His subsequent films have included Cheluvina Chithara (2007), Gaalipata (2008), Krishna (2007), Aramane (2008), Bombaat (2008), Sangama (2008), Circus (2009), Ullasa Utsaha, Maleyali Jotheyali (2009), Eno Onthara (2010), Kool (2011), Maduve Mane (2011), Shyloo (2011), Munjane, Romeo (2012), Shravani Subramanya (2013), Mungaru Male 2 (2016), Sakath (2021) and Gaalipata 2 (2022).

Brand Ambassador
Ganesh was signed as the Brand Ambassador of Reliance Mobile (2009-2011), Coca-Cola (2010-2011), Rim-Jim product from Coca-Cola (2022).

Filmography

Awards and nominations

 Refers to the year in which ceremony was held.

See also
 Ganesh Acharya, an Indian choreographer in Bollywood

References

External links

 

1978 births
Male actors from Bangalore
Kannada male actors
Male actors in Kannada cinema
Indian male film actors
Living people
Filmfare Awards South winners
21st-century Indian male actors
Indian male television actors
Male actors in Kannada television
Indian Gorkhas